Senad Begić (born 10 October 1969) is a Bosnian retired football player.

Club career
He played for Čelik Zenica in their 2001 UEFA Intertoto Cup shock home win over Belgian side AA Gent. He also won the 1996 Bosnia and Herzegovina Cup with them.

International career
Begić made his debut in Bosnia and Herzegovina's first ever official international game, a November 1995 friendly match away against Albania, and has earned a total of 12 caps, scoring no goals. His final international was a March 1997 Dunhill Cup match against China.

References

External links

Profile - NFSBIH

1969 births
Living people
Association football defenders
Bosnia and Herzegovina footballers
Bosnia and Herzegovina international footballers
NK Čelik Zenica players
FK Sarajevo players
Premier League of Bosnia and Herzegovina players